The Xijiang Railway Bridge, is located on the Guangzhou to Nanning highspeed railway with a 450-meter main span that is the world's longest railway-only arch bridge and, together with the Mingzhou Bridge, the second largest steel box arch after the Lupu Bridge in Shanghai.  The basket handle arch carries 2 railway lines over the Xi River.

See also

 List of longest arch bridge spans

References

Arch bridges in China
Through arch bridges in China
Steel bridges in China